Robert Plumptre (1723–1788) was an English churchman and academic, President of Queens' College, Cambridge from 1760.

Life
He was the youngest of ten children of John Plumptre of Nottinghamshire, and was grandson of Henry Plumptre. He was educated by Dr. Henry Newcome at Newcome's School in Hackney, and matriculated as a pensioner of Queens' College, Cambridge, on 11 July 1741. He proceeded B.A. 1744, M.A. 1748, D.D. 1761, and on 21 March 1745 was elected fellow of his college. In 1752 he was instituted to the rectory of Wimpole, Cambridgeshire, on the presentation of Philip Yorke, 1st Earl of Hardwicke; at the same time he held the vicarage of Whaddon. In 1756 Lord Hardwicke made him prebendary of Norwich Cathedral. In 1760 he was elected president of his college, and in 1769 professor of casuistry. These offices, together with his preferments, he held till his death. He was vice-chancellor 1760-61 and 1777-78.

Plumptre interested himself in the history of his college, and left some manuscript collections for it. In the university he supported the movement inaugurated by John Jebb in favour of annual examinations, and was a member of the syndicate appointed on 17 February 1774 to devise a scheme for carrying them out, which was rejected on 19 April in the same year. He is also stated to have been in favour of granting relief to the clergy, who in 1772 petitioned against subscription to the Thirty-nine Articles. He published in 1782 a pamphlet called Hints Respecting some of the University Officers, of which a second edition appeared in 1802. Latin poems by him occur among the congratulatory verses published by the university in 1761 on the occasion of the marriage of George III in 1762, on the birth of a Prince of Wales, and in 1763 on the restoration of peace. Plumptre died at Norwich on 29 October 1788. There is a tablet to his memory on the south side of the presbytery.

Family
He married, in September 1756, Anne, second daughter of Dr. Henry Newcome, his former schoolmaster. By her he had ten children, including the author Anne Plumptre and dramatist James Plumptre.
Another daughter was Annabella (or Bell) who wrote the book Domestic Management; or, the Healthful Cookery-book: to which is prefixed, a treatise on diet (London: B. & R. Crosby, 1810), several novels, and translated A. W. Iffland's play Die Jäger from German (The Foresters. London: Vernor & Hood, 1799), and other German works.

Notes

References

1723 births
1788 deaths
Presidents of Queens' College, Cambridge
18th-century English Anglican priests
People educated at Newcome's School
Vice-Chancellors of the University of Cambridge
Fellows of Queens' College, Cambridge
People from Nottinghamshire
Knightbridge Professors of Philosophy